Shin Sae-Bom (Hangul: 신새봄) (born February 28, 1992) is a South Korean short track speed skater.

External links
 Profile from ISU official website

1992 births
Living people
South Korean female short track speed skaters
Universiade gold medalists for South Korea
Universiade medalists in short track speed skating
Competitors at the 2011 Winter Universiade
21st-century South Korean women